The ADAC GT Masters is a grand tourer-based auto racing series founded by the international Stéphane Ratel Organisation (SRO) and supported by the German ADAC automotive club.  Similar to an earlier ADAC GT Cup series in the 1990s, the new GT Masters ran their first season in 2007. Although the series is based in Germany, select events are run elsewhere in Europe.

ADAC GT Cup
The original ADAC GT Cup was created in 1993, as a national grand tourer championship similar to the Deutsche Tourenwagen Meisterschaft (DTM). The series initially used two divisions, with the upper class running a variety of sports cars, and the smaller class for small coupes. Following dwindling support for the top division, the two classes were combined in 1995. By 1997, the series continued to dwindle, as the series was running only small coupes instead of high powered sports cars. The championship was officially cancelled after the 1997 season as most teams turned to the VLN championship.

Competition

The ADAC GT Masters uses a similar formula to the one used in the FIA GT3 European Championship, also created by the SRO. The ADAC GT Masters is a "PRO-AM" Championship in which a professional driver shares a car with an amateur driver. The exact criteria for what determines an amateur driver and professional driver is laid out by the Fédération Internationale de l'Automobile (FIA). Drivers run in pairs, with each race requiring the team to make a pit stop and swap drivers.

The cars that run in the ADAC GT Masters are also regulated by the FIA. Only cars which have been approved are allowed to compete. Of the cars that are currently approved, all are artificially performance balanced in such a way that the performance of each type of car is as close to equal as possible. This makes the skills of the driver paramount. Current vehicles that will be running in the 2019 championship include Porsche 911 GT3 R, Audi R8 LMS GT3 Evo, Ferrari 488 GT3, Corvette C7 GT3-R, BMW M6 GT3, Lamborghini Huracan GT3, Mercedes-AMG GT3, Aston Martin Vantage GT3, Honda Nsx GT3 EVO.

Each event consists of two races, with a duration of 60 minutes plus one lap. Each car must make a pit stop during each race and switch drivers. In the first race usually the amateur driver starts, if so the professional driver must drive the start in the second race of each round.

The current driver champions are Ricardo Feller and Christopher Mies (Precode: Montaplast by Land-Motorsport - Audi R8 LMS Evo).

The ADAC GT Masters currently runs on German circuits, such as the Oschersleben, Nürburgring, Hockenheimring, and Sachsenring, although they also run events at Circuit Zandvoort in the Netherlands, Autodrom Most in Czech Replublic and the Red Bull Ring in Austria.

Champions

References

https://www.adac-gt-masters.de/uk/wertung/

https://www.adac-gt-masters.de/uk/starterliste/

https://www.gruppec-photography.de/portfolio-2/24h-rennen-nuerburgring/

External links

  
 Racing Sports Cars - ADAC GT Cup and ADAC GT Masters results

 
Recurring sporting events established in 2007
Group GT3
2007 establishments in Germany